Peter Francis Sheridan, is a charity executive and former police officer in Northern Ireland. He is chief executive of Co-operation Ireland, a peace-building charity.

In June 2007, he was appointed an Officer of the Order of the British Empire.

References

Living people
Police Service of Northern Ireland officers
Royal Ulster Constabulary officers
Alumni of the University of Cambridge
Year of birth missing (living people)
British police chief officers